Emilie Goldblum (née Livingston; born 4 January 1983) is a Canadian dancer, aerialist and contortionist, and retired Olympic rhythmic gymnast.

Career
At the age of 10, she moved to Russia (to Novogorsk near Moscow) to train with Russian rhythmic gymnasts and Russian coaches, such as Irina Viner and Lusi Dimitrova.

Livingston is a three-time national champion of Canada in rhythmic gymnastics. She represented Canada at the 1999 Pan American Games in Winnipeg, Manitoba, winning the gold medal as in the individual all-around. She also represented Canada at the 2000 Summer Olympics in Sydney, Australia, placing 18th in the individual all-around competition.

In the film Valerian and the City of a Thousand Planets, Livingston was a body double for Rihanna performing Bubble's pole dance scene. She was also a body double for Emma Stone's aerial work in La La Land.

Personal life 
Livingston married American actor Jeff Goldblum on 8 November 2014. Their first son, Charlie Ocean, was born on 4 July 2015, and second son, River Joe, was born 7 April 2017.

Competitive history

References

External links 
 

1983 births
Living people
Canadian rhythmic gymnasts
Gymnasts at the 2000 Summer Olympics
Olympic gymnasts of Canada
Gymnasts from Toronto
Sportspeople from Etobicoke
Canadian female dancers
Contortionists
Gymnasts at the 1999 Pan American Games
Pan American Games medalists in gymnastics
Pan American Games gold medalists for Canada
Gymnasts at the 1998 Commonwealth Games
Commonwealth Games silver medallists for Canada
Commonwealth Games bronze medallists for Canada
Commonwealth Games medallists in gymnastics
Medalists at the 1999 Pan American Games
Medallists at the 1998 Commonwealth Games